Matthew Finnen Doyle (born May 13, 1987) is an American actor and singer known for his work in musical theater. He made his Broadway debut in 2007 in Spring Awakening as replacement for the role of Hanschen, and later had supporting roles in the Broadway productions of Bye Bye Birdie in 2009 and War Horse in 2011. He joined The Book of Mormon in 2012, replacing Nic Rouleau as Elder Price.

Following a period of performing Off-Broadway and regionally, he joined the Broadway transfer of the gender-swapped production of Company in 2021 playing the role originated by Jonathan Bailey in the West End. For his performance, he won the Tony Award for Best Featured Actor in a Musical.

As singer-songwriter, Doyle performs in live shows and has released two EPs, namely, Daylight (2011) and Constant (2012). He released his first full-length album, Uncontrolled in 2016.

Early life and education
Doyle grew up in Weston, Connecticut, before moving to Southern California in his adolescence. After graduating from Redwood High School in Larkspur, California, Doyle went on to train in the London Academy of Music and Dramatic Art for a year.

Career 
Doyle made his Broadway debut in 2007, at age twenty, as a stand-by in the original Broadway production of Spring Awakening. Following original cast member Jonathan B. Wright's departure, he was promoted to the role of Hanschen until the show closed in January 2009.

In 2009, he portrayed Hugo Peabody in the revival of Bye Bye Birdie. In 2011, he appeared as Billy Naracott (understudying Albert) in Lincoln Center Theater’s production of War Horse. Following War Horse, he starred as Elder Price in the Broadway production of Book of Mormon from November 2012 to January 2014.

On screen, Doyle played Jonathan, Eric van der Woodsen's boyfriend, on CW show Gossip Girl. He also starred in Alan Brown’s adaptation of Romeo and Juliet, Private Romeo, and had a small singing role in the 2009 film, Once More with Feeling.

In addition to his roles on Broadway and on screen, Doyle has starred in numerous off-Broadway and regional productions. He starred as Anthony in Barrow Street Theatre's production of Sweeney Todd, in West Side Story at the Paper Mill Playhouse, Ryan Scott Oliver's Jasper in Deadland at the West End Theatre in New York and the 5th Avenue Theatre in Seattle, Brooklynite at the Vineyard Theatre, the musical Giant in Dallas, and the 2017 stage adaptation of A Clockwork Orange at New World Stages. He also appeared as Peter on a recording of Bare: A Pop Opera.

Doyle is also a singer-songwriter. He released his first EP, Daylight, in 2011, with a follow-up EP in 2012, Constant. He released his first full-length album, Uncontrolled, in 2016. Doyle's writing partner is musical theatre composer, Will Van Dyke. Doyle created a web comic, Dents, with childhood friend, Beth Behrs in 2017.

In 2020, Doyle was cast in the gender-bent Broadway revival of Company as Jamie, a role originated and first performed as a man by Jonathan Bailey in the West End. In 2022, he won a Tony Award for Best Featured Actor in a Musical for his performance.

Doyle frequently performs solo shows and alongside other Broadway performers at New York venues such as 54 Below and Joe's Pub. He streams on Twitch.

Personal life

Doyle is gay. He lives in Jersey City, New Jersey, with his boyfriend Max Clayton.

Awards and nominations

Discography 
Solo album
 2016: Uncontrolled
With The Whiskey 5
 2014: Make the Season Bright
Extended plays
 2012: Constant (EP)
 2011: Daylight (EP)
Cast recordings / anthologies
 2016: Jasper in Deadland
 2011: Our First Mistake
 2010: Thirteen Stories Down
 2010: (Sorta) Love Songs
 2007: bare: A Pop Opera

Acting credits

Film

Television

Theater

References

External links
 
 
 
 Matt Doyle at About the Artists

1987 births
21st-century American male actors
Alumni of the London Academy of Music and Dramatic Art
American male film actors
American male musical theatre actors
American male singer-songwriters
American male stage actors
Place of birth missing (living people)
Living people
American gay actors
American gay musicians
LGBT people from California
LGBT people from New York (state)
American LGBT singers
American LGBT songwriters
Gay singers
Gay songwriters
People from Larkspur, California
Male actors from Jersey City, New Jersey
Male actors from California
Male actors from New York City
Singer-songwriters from California
20th-century LGBT people
21st-century LGBT people
Tony Award winners
Redwood High School (Larkspur, California) alumni
American gay writers